= Covert feather =

Type of feather

Topside of a chicken wing showing all major feather groups

A covert feather or tectrix on a bird is one of a set of feathers, called coverts (or tectrices), which cover other feathers. The coverts help to smooth airflow over the wings and tail.

== Ear coverts ==
The ear coverts are small feathers behind the bird's eye, which cover the ear opening (the ear of a bird has no external features).

== Tail coverts ==
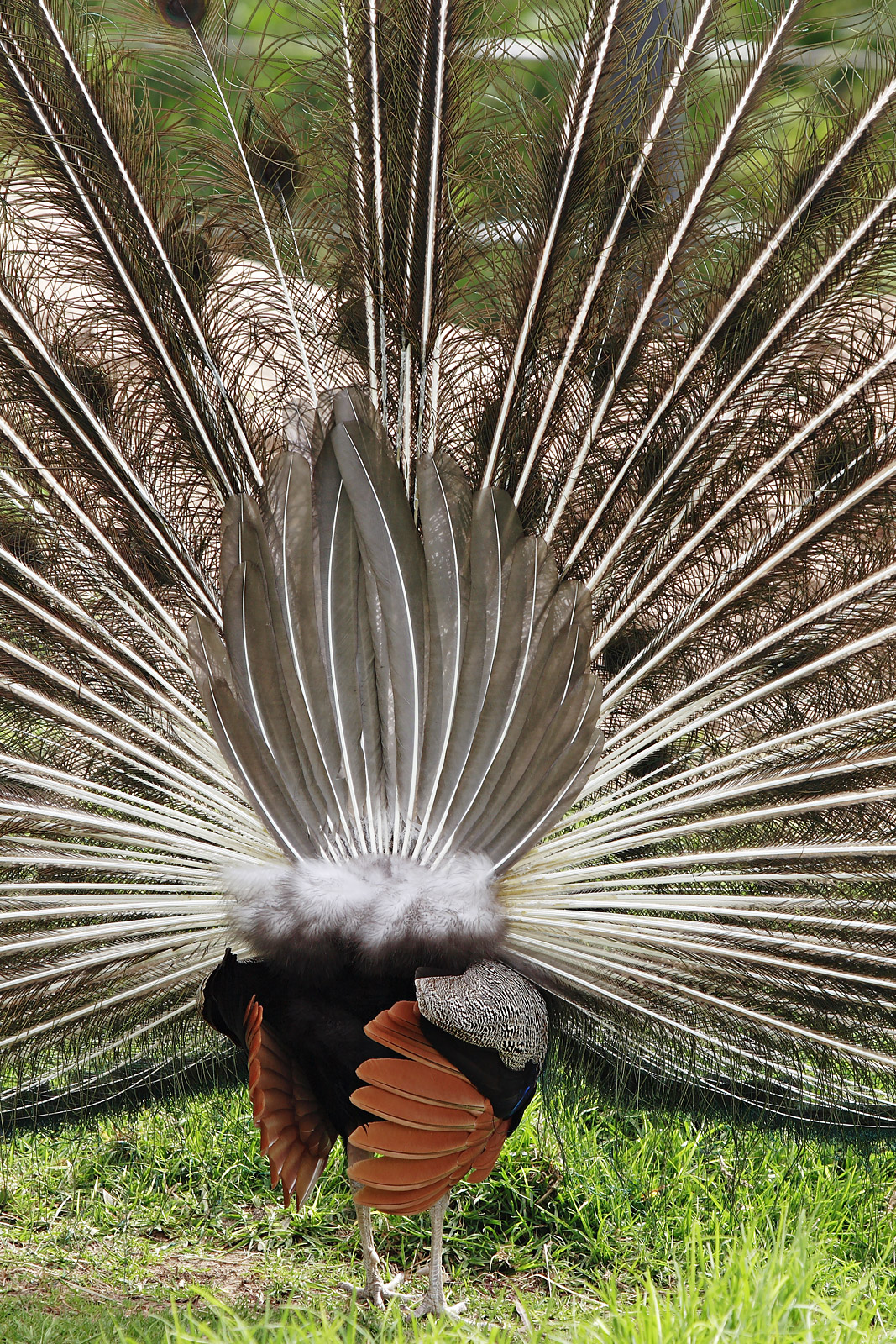
A rear view of an Indian peacock's true tail and elongated uppertail covert feathers

The uppertail and undertail coverts cover the base of the tail feathers above and below. Sometimes these coverts are more specialised. The "tail" of a peacock is made of modified elongated uppertail coverts called a "train".

== Wing coverts ==
The upperwing coverts fall into two groups: those on the inner wing, which overlay the secondary flight feathers, known as the secondary coverts, and those on the outer wing, which overlay the primary flight feathers, the primary coverts. Within each group, the feathers form a number of rows. The feathers of the outermost, largest row are termed greater (primary-/secondary-) coverts; those in the next row are the median (primary-/secondary-) coverts, and any remaining rows are termed lesser (primary-/secondary-) coverts. The underwing has corresponding sets of coverts (the names upperwing coverts and underwing coverts are used to distinguish the corresponding sets). In addition, the front edge of the wing is covered with a group of feathers called the marginal coverts. Within each group of wing coverts, the rows of feathers overlap each other like roof tiles (the greater coverts are overlain by the median coverts, which in turn are overlain by the outermost row of lesser coverts, and so on).

== See also ==
- Flight feather
